Fake Love may refer to:

 "Fake Love" (Drake song), 2016
 "Fake Love" (BTS song), 2018
 "Fake Love", a song by Lil B from the mixtape Obama BasedGod, 2012
 "Fake Love (Yes Men)", a song by Statik Selektah from the album 100 Proof: The Hangover, 2010
 "Nanchatte Ren'ai", a 2009 song by Morning Musume

See also 
 "Faking Love", a 1982 song by T. G. Sheppard and Karen Brooks
 "Fake Love Don't Last", a 2022 song by Machine Gun Kelly from Mainstream Sellout